The 114th Aviation Regiment is an aviation regiment of the U.S. Army.

Structure
The following units are part of the regiment:
 1st Battalion (Security & Support)
 Headquarters and Headquarters Company (AR ARNG)
 Company A (AR ARNG)
 Company B
 Company D
 Detachment 2 (AR ARNG)

References

114